Paragomphus pumilio is a species of dragonfly in the family Gomphidae. It is found in Egypt, Ethiopia, Kenya, and Sudan. Its natural habitats are dry savanna, rivers, freshwater lakes, and hot deserts.

References

Gomphidae
Taxonomy articles created by Polbot
Insects described in 1842